Marion Bartoli won in the final 6–4, 6–3 against Li Na.

Seeds

Draw

Finals

Top half

Bottom half

External links
Draw

Monterrey Open
Monterrey Open